Stator pruininus, the pruinose bean weevil, is a species of leaf beetle in the family Chrysomelidae. It is found in Central America, North America, Oceania, and South America.

References

Further reading

 
 

Bruchinae
Articles created by Qbugbot
Beetles described in 1873